Marko Kopilas (born 22 July 1983) is a Croatian retired footballer. He also holds German citizenship.

References

External links
 

1983 births
Living people
Croatian footballers
SSV Reutlingen 05 players
SV Wehen Wiesbaden players
SV Darmstadt 98 players
Kickers Offenbach players
FC Rot-Weiß Erfurt players
Croatia under-21 international footballers
2. Bundesliga players
3. Liga players
Association football defenders
People from Sindelfingen
Sportspeople from Stuttgart (region)